The Girna River is a river in the state of Maharashtra in western India. It gets its name from the goddess Giraja, also known as Parvati.

Course

The Girna originates at Kem Peak in the Western Ghats mountain range and flows east across Nashik District—where it is joined by the Mausam River—and into Malegaon. It then swings north to join the Tapti River. The biggest dams on it are Chankapur Dam (built by the British near Abhona in the Kalwan tehsil, where the Sarpganga River joins the Girna) and Girna Dam (built in 1969). The river basin lies on the Deccan Plateau, and its valley has fertile soil that is intensively farmed.

The Gazetteer of the Bombay Presidency described the course of the river as follows:

See also

List of rivers of India
Rivers of India

External links
 Girna River at (NIH), Roorkee

References

Rivers of Maharashtra
Tributaries of the Tapti River